Maxim Dekker (born 21 April 2004) is a Dutch professional footballer who plays as a centre-back for Eredivisie team AZ Alkmaar.

Club career
A youth academy graduate of AZ, Dekker signed his first professional contract with the club in August 2020. He made his professional debut for Jong AZ on 30 April 2021 in a 1–0 league win against Roda JC Kerkrade.

International career
Dekker is a current Dutch youth international. In September 2020, he was named in preliminary squad for 2021 UEFA European Under-17 Championship. However, the tournament was cancelled due to COVID-19 pandemic in Europe.

Career statistics

References

External links
 
 Career stats & Profile - Voetbal International

2004 births
Living people
Association football defenders
Dutch footballers
Netherlands youth international footballers
Eerste Divisie players
Eredivisie players
Jong AZ players
AZ Alkmaar players